The 1970 Spanish Grand Prix was a Formula One motor race held at the Jarama circuit on 19 April 1970. It was race 2 of 13 in both the 1970 World Championship of Drivers and the 1970 International Cup for Formula One Manufacturers.

Prior to the race, the organisers of the Grand Prix sparked anger amongst the members of FOCA when they limited the number of starters to only sixteen. To add to the chaos, none of the laps set on Friday were counted towards qualifying. On the morning before the race, the matter seemed resolved and the organisers initially reversed their decision, and those who failed to qualify looked as if they would be allowed to start. The Commission Sportive Internationale then stepped in and forced the Spanish organisers to revert to the original limit of sixteen starters, and the cars that failed to qualify were wheeled off the grid.
 
The race was won by defending world champion Jackie Stewart, driving a March 701 car entered by a privateer Tyrrell team. This was the last win of a privately entered car in Formula One. American driver Mario Andretti took his first Formula One podium in third place. The race was marred by a serious accident involving Jackie Oliver and Jacky Ickx. Both their cars burst into flames, and Ickx was slightly burned after his race overalls became soaked in burning fuel. He recovered sufficiently to be able to compete in the next race, at Monaco. Bruce McLaren scored his last podium, points and race finish.

Qualifying

Qualifying classification

Race

Classification

Championship standings after the race

Drivers' Championship standings

Constructors' Championship standings

References

External links

Spanish Grand Prix
Spanish Grand Prix
1970 in Spanish motorsport
April 1970 sports events in Europe